Michael Frederick Claridge FLS FRES FRSB (born 2 June 1934) is a British entomologist.  He is Emeritus Professor of Entomology at Cardiff University. He received the Linnean Medal for Zoology in 2000 and was President of the Linnean Society 1988–1991.

References

1934 births
Living people
British entomologists
Presidents of the Linnean Society of London
Presidents of the Royal Entomological Society
Fellows of the Royal Entomological Society
Fellows of the Royal Society of Biology
Linnean Medallists